Hong Kong Pegasus FC are a Hong Kong football club based in Yuen Long. Founded in 2008, the club currently competes in the Hong Kong Third Division.

History
TSW Pegasus was established in June 2008, and they had their first season in 2008–09 Hong Kong First Division League with a budget of about HKD$10,000,000.

On 21 December 2008, Pegasus won their first trophy, defeating Sun Hei in the 2008 Senior Shield Final.

In July 2012, the club was renamed as Sun Pegasus following introduction of a new sponsor.

After the 2014–15 season, Sun International Resources Limited withdrew their sponsorship. Their club was renamed Hong Kong Pegasus following a takeover by Canny Leung.

In October 2020, the club was renamed back to TSW Pegasus and returned to Yuen Long Stadium.

After spending 13 years in top flight, Pegasus confirmed their withdrawal from the 2021–22 HKPL season and decided to self-relegate to the Hong Kong Third Division.

Name history 
2008–2012: TSW Pegasus (天水圍飛馬)
2012–2015: Sun Pegasus (太陽飛馬)
2015–2020: Hong Kong Pegasus (香港飛馬)
2020–2021: TSW Pegasus (天水圍飛馬)
2021–present: Hong Kong Pegasus (香港飛馬)

Colours and badge
Pegasus's home colours are a red shirt with white shorts. Their away colours are a white shirt with black shorts.  The current kits are designed by adidas. The team historically has played with an all yellow kit as their home colours, but after their name change to Hong Kong Pegasus, the club owners decided to make a change. It proved to be a largely unpopular decision with the club's fans.

The current Pegasus badge is a pegasus inside a yellow and red shield, which is representative of "creating miracles", "vigor", "vitality" and "creativeness" in Greek mythology.

Club equipment
TSW Pegasus has a bus for team transportation which is sponsored by Fuso.

The team also rented an entire 48th floor of a block of Central Park Towers in Tin Shui Wai as accommodation for team members. Renovation work is already completed.

Stadium
TSW Pegasus applied to the Hong Kong Football Association for the use of Yuen Long Stadium and Tin Shui Wai Sports Ground for its home matches. HKFA replied that it will grant the application provided the grass turf at the stadium is up to standard after its examination. Later, the HKFA accepted the application of having the Yuen Long Stadium as TSW Pegasus's home ground for the game against South China on 5 October 2008. The team's directors promised to make a fanfare at the stadium on the day.

HKFA chairman Leung Hung Tak later claimed that a total of three home games for TSW Pegasus will be played at Yuen Long Stadium in the 2008–09 season.

For the 2013–14 season, TSW Pegasus has moved its home ground from Yuen Long Stadium to Mong Kok Stadium.

From 2015 to 2018, the club used Hong Kong Stadium as their home ground.

By virtue of their third-place finish in the 2017–18 season, Pegasus exercised their right to use the Mong Kok Stadium for 2018–19.

In October 2020, Pegasus returned to Yuen Long Stadium.

Supporters
Pegasus has a fanbase mainly based in Yuen Long and Tin Shui Wai as they are Pegasus' original home districts. The club has an official fanclub known as "Pegasus Base". The club's slogan is "Pegasus, our team".

Community contribution
TSW Pegasus held a big recruitment event at Tin Shui Wai Sports Ground to recruit U-15 and U-19 team players on 3 August 2008. At the same time, the team also recruited a few team assistants in order to provide job opportunity for the local residents. It played a friendly game against South China in the afternoon and the teams drew 1–1, TSW Pegasus lost (3–5) on penalties.

Season-to-season record

Note:

Continental record

Honours

League
Hong Kong First Division
Runners-up (3): 2009–10, 2011–12, 2013–14

Cup competitions

Hong Kong Senior Shield
Champions (1): 2008–09
Runners-up (1): 2013–14
Hong Kong FA Cup
Champions (2): 2009–10, 2015–16
Runners-up (3): 2008–09, 2011–12, 2012–13
Hong Kong League Cup
Runners-up (3): 2008–09, 2010–11, 2011–12
Hong Kong Sapling Cup
Champions (1): 2015–16
Runners-up (1): 2016–17

Managers

 José Ricardo Rambo (1 July 2008 – June 2009)
 Dejan Antonić (August 2009 – 30 December 2009)
 José Ricardo Rambo (30 December 2009 – 30 June 2010)
 Chan Hiu Ming (1 July 2010 – 14 June 2012)
 Chan Ho Yin (10 July 2012 – 9 October 2012)
 Chan Chi Hong (9 October 2012 – 9 June 2014)
 José Ricardo Rambo (9 June 2014 – 27 January 2015)
 Chan Chi Hong (27 January 2015 – 30 June 2015)
 Lee Chi Kin (8 July 2015 – 11 April 2016)
 Kevin Bond (11 April 2016 – May 2016)
 Steve Gallen (23 June 2016 – 3 November 2016)
 Kevin Bond (7 November 2016, – 6 May 2017)
 Yeung Ching Kwong (19 June 2017 – 14 June 2018)
 Pedro García (2 July 2018 – 30 September 2018)
 Chan Ho Yin (30 September 2018 – 10 July 2019)
 Man Pei Tak (10 July 2019 – 10 May 2020)
 Kwok Kar Lok (10 May 2020 – 30 June 2021)

References

External links
 Official webpage 

 
Football clubs in Hong Kong
Hong Kong Premier League
Association football clubs established in 2008
2008 establishments in Hong Kong